Claus Thomsen (born 31 May 1970) is a Danish former professional footballer. He won the Danish Cup with AGF Aarhus and played in England for top level teams Ipswich Town and Everton, as well as Wolfsburg in Germany. He played 20 matches for the Danish national team, and represented Denmark at the 1992 Summer Olympics and 1996 European Championship.

Life and career
Born in Aarhus, Thomsen started his career at local top-flight club AGF Aarhus, where he initially played as a midfielder. Thomsen made his debut for the Danish under-21 national team in May 1989, where under-21 national team coach Richard Møller Nielsen used the 6' 3" Thomsen as a central defender. Thomsen was named under-21 national team captain in 1990. In December 1990, Thomsen signed a new contract with AGF, rejecting interest from Brøndby IF and B1903.

In November 1991, Thomsen was scouted by Celtic FC manager Liam Brady, but the deal fell through due to "too many intermediaries" according to Claus Thomsen himself. He was injured in an under-21 national game against Poland in March 1992, but recovered in time to help AGF win the 1992 Danish Cup. He also captained Denmark at the 1992 Summer Olympics, where he played all three of Denmark's matches, and scored a goal against Mexico. In the fall of 1992, he lost his place in the central defence in AGF's starting line-up, and he was used in a number of different positions. He went on trial at Werder Bremen in December 1992, but was not signed by Werder manager Otto Rehhagel.

Ipswich Town
In June 1994, he moved abroad to play for English club Ipswich Town, in a transfer deal worth £250,000. He was called up for his Danish national team début, by national coach Richard Møller Nielsen, in April 1995. Thomsen was also called up to the Danish national squad for the 1996 European Championship, and played in all of Denmark's three matches before elimination. He made a total 97 appearances and scored 8 goals for Ipswich, and was one of the stronger players in the weakest side in Ipswich Town's history. In his first season, he was relegated with Ipswich in 1994/95, and was a key player in the team that missed out on the First Division play-offs in 1995–96; however, as Ipswich were looking to improve their side, he was sold to Everton, for £900,000, in January 1997.

Everton
At Everton, Thomsen notably scored an own goal in the Merseyside derby at Goodison Park on 16 April 1997, meaning that Everton were held to a 1–1 draw by Liverpool, although they still achieved Premier League survival in 15th place. He scored once at the right end for Everton, his side's only goal in a 2–1 defeat to Derby County.

Akademisk Boldklub
After little more than a year at Everton, marred by poor performances, he moved back to Denmark for £500,000 in March 1998, to play for Akademisk Boldklub (AB). He stayed at AB for six months, before moving abroad once again.

VfL Wolfsburg
Thomsen joined German club VfL Wolfsburg in September 1998. In April 1999, he ended his Danish national team career, citing a lacking energy surplus. Struggling with injuries, he remained at Wolfsburg for four years, but saw little playing time during this period, retiring in April 2002.

Career statistics

International
Source:

Honours
AGF Aarhus
Danish Cup: 1991–92

References

External links
Danish national team stats at DBU.dk
Danish Superliga stats at Superligaen.com

1970 births
Living people
Danish men's footballers
Aarhus Gymnastikforening players
Akademisk Boldklub players
Ipswich Town F.C. players
Everton F.C. players
Premier League players
VfL Wolfsburg players
Danish Superliga players
Bundesliga players
Olympic footballers of Denmark
Footballers at the 1992 Summer Olympics
UEFA Euro 1996 players
Denmark international footballers
Denmark under-21 international footballers
Danish expatriate men's footballers
Danish expatriate sportspeople in England
Danish expatriate sportspeople in Germany
Expatriate footballers in England
Expatriate footballers in Germany
Footballers from Aarhus
Association football defenders